The women's 80 metres hurdles event at the 1963 Pan American Games was held at the Pacaembu Stadium in São Paulo on 3 and 4 May.

Medalists

Results

Heats

Final

References

Athletics at the 1963 Pan American Games
1963